The name Sihala is used in following articles.

 Sihala - A town in Islamabad, Pakistan 
 Sihala (spider) - spider genus of family Pholcidae, restricted to India and Sri Lanka